Elizabeth Courtney may refer to:

Eliza Courtney  (1792–1859), illegitimate daughter of Prime Minister Charles Grey, 2nd Earl Grey and Georgiana, Duchess of Devonshire
Beth Courtney, Elizabeth Courtney, (born 1945), businesswoman

See also
Elizabeth Courtenay (disambiguation)